Élodie Tessier (born March 14, 1996) is a Canadian 2.5 point wheelchair basketball player. She was part of the Under 25 national team at the 2015 Women's U25 Wheelchair Basketball World Championship in Beijing, and the senior Canadian national women's team at the Americas Cup in Cali, Colombia, in 2017, and the Wheelchair Basketball World Championship in Hamburg in 2018.

Biography
Tessier was born in Montreal, Quebec, on March 14, 1996. As a child, she was soon physically overtaken by her twin sister; but in high school, another girl in a wheelchair introduced her to wheelchair basketball. Élodie soon became the sportier of the two sisters.

Classified as a 2.5 point player, Tessier was part of the Canadian junior team at the 2013 Youth Parapan American Games in Buenos Aires (where she also represented Canada in the Under 21 3-on-3 competition) and then the 2015 Women's U25 Wheelchair Basketball World Championship in Beijing. In 2017, she won the Canadian Wheelchair Basketball League (CWBL) Women's National Championship in Montreal, Quebec, with the Gladiateurs de Laval.  In the same year she was part of the senior national team at the Americas Cup in Cali, Colombia, where Team Canada was placed first. In April 2018, she was part of Team Quebec at the CWBL Women's National Championship in Richmond, British Columbia. Team Quebec came second, and she was named as an All-Star. In August 2018, she was part of Team Canada at the 2018 Wheelchair Basketball World Championship in Hamburg.

Notes

1996 births
Canadian women's wheelchair basketball players
Living people
Paralympic wheelchair basketball players of Canada
Sportspeople from Montreal
Canadian twins
UT Arlington Mavericks women's wheelchair basketball players
20th-century Canadian women
21st-century Canadian women
Commonwealth Games gold medallists for Canada